This is a list of Honorary Fellows of Hertford College, Oxford.

 Dame Helen Alexander
 John Baring, 7th Baron Ashburton
 Sir Walter Bodmer
 Martin Bridson
 Nancee Oku Bright
 Sir Ian Brownlie
 Gilbert Campion, 1st Baron Campion
 Sir Sherard Cowper-Coles
 David Daniell
 John Dewar
 Richard W. Fisher
 Tom Fletcher
 R.F. Foster
 Sir David Goldberg
 Andrew Goudie
 Drue Heinz
 Jeremy Heywood, Baron Heywood of Whitehall
 Charlotte Hogg
 Will Hutton
 Sir Nicholas Jackson
 Jeffrey John
 Sir Jeffrey Jowell
 Soweto Kinch
 John Landers
 Paul Langford
 Paul Manduca
 Thomas McMahon
 Roderich Moessner
 Paul Muldoon
 David Pannick, Baron Pannick
 Sir Bruce Pattullo
 Hugh Cecil, 1st Baron Quickswood
 Mary Robinson
 Jacqui Smith
 Sir Hugh Springer
 Robert Stopford
 David Waddington, Baron Waddington
 Mary Warnock, Baroness Warnock
 Stephanie West
 Sir Roger Wheeler
 Sir John Whitehead
 Henry Williams
 Tobias Wolff
 Sir Christopher Zeeman

See also 

:Category:Alumni of Hertford College, Oxford
 :Category:Fellows of Hertford College, Oxford

Fellows of Hertford College, Oxford
Hertford
People associated with Hertford College, Oxford